Kalla, Kállá or Källa is a given name and surname. It is a Danish, Finnish, Icelandic and Swedish feminine given name that is a feminine form of Kalle, short form of Karolina and an alternate form of Karla. Kalla is also an English feminine given name, but its derived from the Greek root name Kalós. Kállá is a Sami masculine given name that is an alternate form of Kalle. Notable people who are known by this name include the following:

Given name
Kalla Ankourao, Nigerien politician
Källa Bie (born 1974), Swedish actress
Kalla Gertze (1960–2008), Namibian politician
Kalla Pasha (1879–1933), American wrestler, vaudeville comedian, and film actor

Surname
Bulaki Das Kalla (born 1949), Indian politician
Charlotte Kalla (born 1987), Swedish cross-country skier
Daniel Kalla (born 1966), Canadian author and physician
Jan-Philipp Kalla (born 1986), German football player
Jaroslav Kalla (born 1979), Czech ice hockey player
Jusuf Kalla (born 1942), Indonesian politician
Lachhmi Dhar Kalla, Indian scholar
Marcel Kalla, Congolese politician
Raymond Kalla (born 1975), Cameroonian football player

See also

Calla (name)
Kala (name)
Kalle
Kalli (name)
Kallu (name)
Karla (name)
Kayla (name)

Notes

Danish feminine given names
English feminine given names
Finnish feminine given names
Icelandic feminine given names
Swedish feminine given names